IPSC Bosnia and Herzegovina is the Bosnian association for practical shooting under the International Practical Shooting Confederation.

References 

Regions of the International Practical Shooting Confederation
Practical Shooting